Dungri is a village located in the Valsad district, in the West Indian state of Gujarat.  The village is served by bus and by the Dungri Railway Station, located in the heart of Dungri, close to the Bazzar. Balaji Wafers is located in Dungri, by National Highway 8

Demographics
The highest population is Patel.

Economy
Dungri's economy includes range of agriculture, including mango, rice, and sugar cane.

The economy of Dungri has been growing significantly for the past decade. For the past several years there have been numerous new homes and buildings constructed. The price of the land has significantly grown in the past decade which has attracted more investors to purchase and sell the land.

Banks
HDFC Bank
State Bank Of India
Central Bank

Hospital
Dr. Dineshbhai D. Vaidya, Hospital
Arpan Hospital
Primary Health Centre
Referel hospital

Houses of worship
Bhramadev Bapa Mandir
Ramji Mandir
Amba Mata Mandir
Khodiyar Mataji Mandir
Swaminarayan Mandir
 Shiv temple
Sai Baba Mandir
Joganmata Mandir
Masjid- r.s masjid

Schools
Purav Vibhag Dungari School
Prathamik School
Sarvajanik High School
Jivinana Primary School

Railways
  (DGI)

National highway
National highway no.8

Villages in Valsad district